Anthracobia melaloma is a species of apothecial fungus belonging to the family Pyronemataceae. It produces orangish cup-or disc-like fruit bodies that have small brown hairs around the edge. Fruit bodies occur in burn sites.

References

External links

Pyronemataceae
Fungi described in 1805
Fungi of North America
Taxa named by Johannes Baptista von Albertini
Taxa named by Lewis David de Schweinitz